John Cristofer Valladares Contreras (born 24 March 1980) was a Chilean footballer.

His last club was San Luis Quillota.

Honours

Club
Universidad de Chile
Primera División de Chile (1): 2000
Copa Chile (1): 2000

Melipilla
Primera B (1): 2006

References
 

1980 births
Living people
Chilean footballers
Audax Italiano footballers
Deportes La Serena footballers
Unión San Felipe footballers
Deportes Melipilla footballers
San Luis de Quillota footballers
Universidad de Chile footballers
Santiago Wanderers footballers
Coquimbo Unido footballers
Association football defenders